Oh, Baby! is the 20th comedy album by Bill Cosby, recorded live at the Celebrity Theater in Anaheim, California on November 12, 1991.  It recounts some of his experiences in marriage, and an occasion where he goes skiing with a friend.

It was Cosby's last live comedy album recording for 22 years, until his next comedy album, Far From Finished, which was released in 2013. He recorded other non-comedy material in the meantime.

Track listing
 Oh, Baby! - 24:32
 Skiing - 25:03

References

Bill Cosby live albums
Stand-up comedy albums
Spoken word albums by American artists
Live spoken word albums
1991 live albums
Geffen Records live albums
1990s comedy albums